Lee Shi Tian is a Hong Kong Magic: The Gathering player inducted into the Hall of Fame in 2018. He first came to prominence in 2008 when he won Grand Prix Birmingham, and has since made the final day of competition at the Pro Tour on five occasions.

Achievements

References 

Living people
Magic: The Gathering players
Hong Kong people
Year of birth missing (living people)